Acharya Brojendra Nath Seal College popularly known as ABN Seal, earlier Victoria College, is a state-government owned co-educational college in Cooch Behar, West Bengal, India. It was established in 1888 and offers undergraduate and postgraduate education. The college is affiliated to the Cooch Behar Panchanan Barma University and accredited as A by NAAC. The college has been conferred "Centre of Excellence" status by the University Grants Commission.

History

Acharya Brojendra Nath Seal College was established in 1888 as Victoria College by Maharaja Nripendra Narayan of Koch Bihar to enhance student capability in the Kingdom. The first principal was John Cornwallis Godley who in 1895 became the second principal of Aitchison College in Lahore. Later Maharaja Nripendra Naryayan offered the post of principal to Acharya Brajendra Nath Seal, a Brahmo and philosopher, who remained in the post for eighteen years from 1896 to 1913. In 1950, when the state of Cooch Behar was merged into Union of India, the governance was passed to Government of West Bengal. It was earlier affiliated to the University of Calcutta and University of North Bengal and is now affiliated to Cooch Behar Panchanan Barma University after the creation of the same. In 1970, it was renamed as Acharya Brojendra Nath Seal College. It is one of the few colleges under the Cooch Behar Panchanan Barma University to give postgraduate education.

Facilities and campus

The college is divided into six blocks — administrative, bioscience, centenary, humanities, chemistry, and library — and twelve departments. The college has separate hostels for boys and girls with a capacity of 85 and 75 respectively. There are separate common rooms for boys, girls and teachers with facilities for indoor games like carom and  table tennis. There is provision for playing outdoor games. There is an in-campus canteen offering snacks and beverages. The college has an IGNOU study center to facilitate distance education.

The library has LAN facilities and LIBSYS software and follows open access for PG students. The library has photocopying facilities and is partially computerised. Computers with Internet connection are available in the computer center.
There are twenty laboratories for science subjects.

The college also has hostels for both boys and girls. The Nripendra Narayan Memorial Boys' Hostel is the boy's hostel located right next to the college. Sister Nivedita Girls’ Hostel is the girl's hostel which is also located near the college campus.

Notable alumni
Rai Chaudhuri Satish Chandra Mustafi, Secretary and Extra-Ordinary Member, Cooch Behar State Council, Additional Member, Cooch Behar Legislative Council, Cooch Behar State, music composer and sitarist
Rajendra Prasad Roy, State Pleader, Cooch Behar State, musician and sitarist
Ambika Charan Roy 
Pulin Bihari Das, Indian Revolutionary
Dr. Suresh Chandra Bandopadhyay, Indian Revolutionary
Kali Mohan Ghosh, Indian Revolutionary
Ashruman Das Gupta, Household Minister, Cooch Behar State, writer
Birendralal Sarkar
Subodh Kumar Chakraborty, Travelogue Writer, Novelist
Shivendra Narayan Mandal, Folk artist, researcher and writer on Folk music.
Bishnu Prasad Rabha, revolutionary, music composer and singer
Panchanan Barma (1865–1935), reformer from Cooch Behar
Amiya Bhushan Majumdar (1918-2001), Novelist
 Amar Roy Pradhan (1930 – 2013), Indian politician from All India Forward Bloc

Notable faculty members
Acharya Brajendra Nath Seal, Principal, 1896-1913
Sadhu T.L. Vaswani, Principal, 1915-1917
Prof. Joy Gopal Bandopadhyaya, Professor of English
Prof. Chunilal Mukherjee, Professor of Economics
Prof. Sarat Chandra Gupta, Principal
Prof. Amulya Ratan Gupta, Professor of English, 1920-1952
Dr. Kanak Kumar Dhar, B.Sc., M.B. (CAL),L.R.C.P. & S. (EDIN), L.M. (DUB), D.T.M. & D.T.H. (L'Pool)
Prof. Tarapada Chattapadhyaya, Professor of Physics
Prof. Chandika Prasad Bandopadhyaya, Principal

See also

References

External links
 

Colleges affiliated to Cooch Behar Panchanan Barma University
Academic institutions formerly affiliated with the University of North Bengal
Universities and colleges in Cooch Behar district
Educational institutions established in 1888
Commerce colleges in India
Arts colleges in India
1888 establishments in India
Education in the princely states of India